The 1986 Australian Football Championships was an Australian rules football series between representative teams of the three major football states. Games involving Victoria were played under State of Origin rules, whilst the match between Western Australia and South Australia involved players based in their respective states at the time. The competition was won by Western Australia.

Results

Game 1 

|- style="background:#ccf;"
| Home team
| Home team score
| Away team
| Away team score
| Ground
| Crowd
| Date
| Time
| Broadcast Network
|- style="background:#fff;"
| South Australia
| 18.17 (125)
| Victoria
| 17.13 (115)
| Football Park
| 43,143
| 13 May 1986 
|
|

 E. J. Whitten Medal: Kevin Walsh (Victoria)
 Fos Williams Medal: Craig Bradley (South Australia)

Game 2 

|- style="background:#ccf;"
| Home team
| Home team score
| Away team
| Away team score
| Ground
| Crowd
| Date
| Time
| Broadcast Network
|- style="background:#fff;"
| Western Australia
| 18.19 (127)
| South Australia
| 12.16 (88)
| Football Park
|
| 27 May 1986 
|
|

 Fos Williams Medal: Andrew Jarman (South Australia)

Game 3 

|- style="background:#ccf;"
| Home team
| Home team score
| Away team
| Away team score
| Ground
| Crowd
| Date
| Time
| Broadcast Network
|- style="background:#fff;"
| Western Australia
| 21.11 (137)
| Victoria
| 20.14 (134)
| Subiaco Oval
| 39,863
| 8 July 1986 
|
|

 Simpson Medal: Brad Hardie (Western Australia)
 E. J. Whitten Medal: Dale Weightman (Victoria)
 Tassie Medal: Brad Hardie (Western Australia)

Standings

Squads

References 

Australian rules interstate football
1986 in Australian rules football